Grubb Street may refer to: 

Grubb Street, an earlier name for Fleet Street, the main centre of newspaper printing and publishing in London 
Grubb Street, a location in Happisburgh, Norfolk, England
Grubb Street, Kent, a settlement in Kent, England